Nine High may refer to:

 Nine High (band), a hip-hop group
 Nine High a Pallet, an album by brute